Reshkuiyeh (also Romanized as Reshkū’īyeh; also known as Ashk, Ashkui, Ashkū’īyeh, and Reshgūyeh) is a village in Garizat Rural District, Nir District, Taft County, Yazd Province, Iran. At the 2006 census, its population was 951, in 282 families.

References 

Populated places in Taft County